Switzerland has a large economy and highly skilled labor force. Fifteen Swiss companies are included on Fortune's "Global 500" list (in 2011). As of 2018 the largest non-financial companies in terms of annual revenue were Glencore, Vitol and Trafigura, with Nestlé as the largest employer. The largest banks were UBS and Credit Suisse, and the largest insurance company was Zurich Insurance Group.

Largest companies 
Ranked by revenue 2017.

Largest banks

Ranked by total assets in 2015.

Largest insurance companies

Ranked by gross inflow of premiums in 2016.

References

Handelszeitung, PME Magazine - Top 2006, Les plus grandes entreprises en Suisse

External links
 Fortune Global 500 (Swiss Companies 2011)
 Forbes Global 2000 (Swiss Companies 2006)
 Bisnode D&B Switzerland
 SWX, the Swiss Stock Exchange 

Lists of largest private companies by country
companies by revenue

fr:Classement des plus grandes entreprises suisses en 2005